The 11th Golden Melody Awards ceremony was held at the Sun Yat-sen Memorial Hall in Xinyi District, Taipei, Taiwan, on 28 April 2000. Aboriginal music featured prominently in this award ceremony.

References

External links
 11th Golden Melody Awards nominees
 11th Golden Melody Awards winners

Golden Melody Awards
Golden Melody Awards
Golden Melody Awards
Golden Melody Awards